Hobman is a surname. Notable people with the surname include:

Al Hobman (1925–2008), New Zealand professional wrestler, trainer, and promoter
Daisy L. Hobman, feminist writer
David Hobman (1927–2003), British activist and broadcaster
Joseph Burton Hobman (1872–1953), British politician and journalist